Tanner Horgan (born February 12, 1998 in Sudbury, Ontario) is a Canadian curler.

Career

Juniors
As a bantam aged curler, Horgan won three Northern Ontario titles (2010, 2013 and 2015). In 2012, he won a provincial elementary school championship for all of Ontario, representing MacLeod Public School.

Horgan won his first Northern Ontario junior title in 2014, earning him and teammates Nicholas Servant, brother Jacob and Maxime Blais the right to represent the region at the 2014 Canadian Junior Curling Championships. There, he skipped the team to a 5-5 finish, missing the playoffs. The next year, Horgan again won the Northern Ontario title, this time with his brother Jacob at third and Connor Lawes playing second. At the 2015 Canadian Junior Curling Championships, Horgan again led Northern Ontario to a 5-5 record.

Horgan went undefeated at the 2016 Northern Ontario Junior Curling Championships, winning his third straight title. The team lineup was relatively unchanged with Nicholas Bissonnette added to the team in replace of Lawes. The team finally made the playoffs at that year's national juniors, after finishing the round robin in first place with a 9-1 record, earning them a bye to the final. However, Manitoba's Matt Dunstone rink proved to be the better team, defeating Northern Ontario 11-4 to claim the championship.

Men's
Horgan and his men's team of brother Jacob, Blais and lead Scott Foy qualified for the 2016 Northern Ontario men's curling championship, Horgan's first provincial. There, he led his team to a 3-4 record.

Personal life
Horgan is employed as an ice technician at Roy's Curling Ice Services. he is in a relationship with fellow curler Keira McLaughlin and lives in Mississauga. He attended Laurentian University. His sisters Tracy Fleury and Jennifer Wylie are also accomplished curlers.

Grand Slam record

References

External links

1998 births
Curlers from Northern Ontario
Living people
Sportspeople from Greater Sudbury
Canadian male curlers
21st-century Canadian people
Curling ice makers
Sportspeople from Mississauga
Laurentian University alumni